George Howard, 4th Earl of Suffolk (c. 17 July 162521 April 1691) was an English peer. He was a son of Theophilus Howard, 2nd Earl of Suffolk, and was styled Hon. George Howard from 1640 to 1688/9.

He was commissioned a captain in the Dutch States Army in 1646. In 1647, he became Master of the Horse to the Duke of York, and a Gentleman of the Bedchamber to the Duke in 1648. In January 1688/9 he succeeded his brother, James Howard, 3rd Earl of Suffolk as Earl of Suffolk. He died in 1691 without male issue and was succeeded by his brother Henry. His daughter Elizabeth married Percy Kirke and his daughter Anne married William Jephson.

References

1624 births
1691 deaths
George
George Howard, 4th Earl of Suffolk